Adams, Pennsylvania may refer to:

 Adams, Armstrong County, Pennsylvania
 Adams County, Pennsylvania

Adams Township
Adams Township, Butler County, Pennsylvania
Adams Township, Cambria County, Pennsylvania
Adams Township, Snyder County, Pennsylvania